The lesser banana frog (Afrixalus brachycnemis) is a species of frog in the family Hyperoliidae.

It is found in Malawi, Mozambique, and Tanzania. Its natural habitats are moist savanna and shrubland, seasonally wet or flooded lowland grassland, swamps, intermittent freshwater marshes, and agricultural land. The species may be slightly impacted by agricultural encroachment and insecticide use.

Description

African lesser banana frog has transparent skin that and their bones can been seen through it.

Habitat

The Lesser banana frogs natural habitats are marshes in moist grassland and savanna at elevations up to 1,400 m down to 400 m. They can survive in anthropogenic habitats. Breeding takes place in ephemeral ponds with dense peripheral vegetation.

References

Afrixalus
Frogs of Africa
Amphibians of Malawi
Amphibians of Mozambique
Amphibians of Tanzania
Amphibians described in 1896
Taxa named by George Albert Boulenger
Taxonomy articles created by Polbot